Direcţia Generală de Protecţie Internă (General Directorate for Internal Security, DGPI) is the criminal intelligence agency of the Romanian Ministry of Internal Affairs.  It was created following the disbanding of UM 0215.

The objective of the Directorate-General for Information and Internal Protection is to know the risks, threats and vulnerabilities within the remit of the Ministry of Internal Affairs to ensure an effective approach and the integration of an operational situation, in order to enforce laws and uphold the rule of law and democracy.

Number of Employees
In November 2003, the DGPI had 2,400 employees.

In 2006 the number of DGPI employees was 2,000 and in 2009 it reached 3,200.

In 2016, before the dissolution, DGPI had 1800 employees.

Organization
The county sections of the DGPI are called the Information and Internal Protection Service (SIPI).

Leadership
 August 2016 - present — Mihai Mărculescu

See also
 Foreign Intelligence Service (Romania) (SIE)
 Serviciul de Telecomunicații Speciale (STS)

References

External links 
 

Romanian intelligence agencies
Ministry of Administration and Interior (Romania)
National law enforcement agencies of Romania